Rabbi Gershon Ashkenazi was a Polish Talmudist who studied under Joel Sirkis. He was also a disciple of the Maharam Shif, and the Rabbi Heschel of Kraków.

During his lifetime, Ashkenazi was a recognized authority in Talmudic law. Ashkenazi authored the Sefer Avodas HaGersuhni.

The ritual inquiries directed to him while rabbi of Metz from western Germany and Alsace-Lorraine show that after his advent in that city he was really the spiritual and intellectual authority for the Jews of those countries. It was mainly in Metz that he exercised influence as a teacher. Ashkenazi was revered and loved by his large number of self attracted pupils, chief among these was Rabbi David Oppenheim.

References

Year of birth missing
Year of death missing
Rabbis from Nikolsburg
17th-century German rabbis
German Ashkenazi Jews